Formas Íntimas is a Colombian women's football club based in Medellín. The club started a two-year partnership with Envigado in 2017 and participated in the first two editions of the Colombian Women's Football League. In 2019, they started a new partnership with Independiente Medellín.

History
The club was founded officially in 2002 by the clothing company Formas Íntimas. However, they competed in the Liga Antioqueña de Fútbol since 2001, officially joining in 2003.

The club's first great achievement was to represent Colombian football in the inaugural 2009 Copa Libertadores de Fútbol Femenino. The club earned this right after the Federación Colombiana de Fútbol determined that they are the most representative women's club, due to their success in all levels of the Colombia women's national football team and their achievements in the Torneo de la Feria de las Flores.

Formas Íntimas finished second in Group B, behind Universidad Autónoma of Paraguay, thereby proceeding to the semifinals, where they lost 5–0 to eventual champions Santos of Brazil. Formas Íntimas then defeated Everton of Chile 2–0 to capture the third place.

Formas Íntimas were eliminated in the group stage of the 2010 Copa Libertadores as Group A's bottom team. In the 2011 edition, the team was second in Group C, which was not enough to qualify for the semifinals.

Last squad (2015)

Honours

Copa Libertadores
Copa Libertadores:
Runners-up (1):  2013

References

External links
Official website
Formas Íntimas PDF page

Women's football clubs in Colombia
Association football clubs established in 2002
2002 establishments in Colombia